Bishop State Community College (BSCC) is a public, historically black community college with campuses and facilities throughout Mobile and Washington Counties in Alabama. The college was founded in Mobile, Alabama, in 1927, and is accredited by the Southern Association of Colleges and Schools Commission on Colleges. It offers more than 50 associate degree and certificate programs.

BSCC's athletic teams compete in the Alabama Community College Conference (ACCC) of the National Junior College Athletic Association (NJCAA). They are collectively known as the Wildcats.

History
Bishop State Community College was founded in 1927 as the Mobile, Alabama, extension of Alabama State College, and initially offered courses to African-American certified teachers. In 1936, it was organized into a two-year college and renamed Alabama State College - Mobile Center, with O.H. Johnson serving as the first dean. In 1965, Alabama legislation officially declared BSCC a state junior college independent from Alabama State College, and it was renamed Mobile State Junior College. The Alabama State Board of Education renamed the college S.D. Bishop State Junior College for its first president, Dr. Sanford D. Bishop, in 1971. In 1989, the board renamed it Bishop State Community College due to its expanded career, vocational, transfer and community service offerings.

Historically, BSCC has primarily served the inner-city residents of Mobile and Prichard, Alabama to prepare them for open industry positions and career advancement.

Campus 
BSCC has seven on-site campuses in Mobile County. Its five off-site locations are high schools throughout Mobile and Washington Counties.

Mobile Campuses

Main Campus 
Main Campus is located at 351 North Broad Street. The campus was acquired in 1942, making it BSCC's original building when the college was first established.

As of February 2021, the Mobile County Commission approved $350,000 to fund the construction of the Advanced Manufacturing Center and Health Sciences Facility on Main Campus. The   Advanced Manufacturing Center is designed for skilled workforce development training grounds for careers in process technology, industrial maintenance, electronics engineering technology and robotics, among others. The Health Sciences Facility will include a  nursing simulation site to train nursing students in patient care. Both buildings were scheduled to open in Fall 2021.

Southwest Campus 
Southwest Campus is located at 925 Dauphin Island Parkway. Established in 1947 as Southwest State Technical College, a vocational school, it was consolidated into BSCC in 1991.

Carver Campus 
Carver Campus is located at 414 Stanton Road. Established in 1962 as Carver State Technical College, a vocational school, it was consolidated into BSCC in 1991.

Baker-Gaines Central Campus 
Baker-Gaines Central Campus is located at 1365 Dr. Martin Luther King, Jr. Avenue. In 1995, the Mobile County School Board sold the campus, formerly Central High School, to BSCC for one dollar. It is home to the Division of Health Related Professions, a museum with Central High School and early BSCC artifacts, a child-care center, bookstore, multimedia center, cafeteria facilities and a 1,200-seat auditorium.

City of Semmes Training Center 
The Semmes location is at 9010 Forest Street in Semmes, Alabama. The facility offers Art, English, Math, Psychology and Speech Communication program courses.

Theodore Oaks Shopping Center - Suite B 
The Theodore location is at 5808 US-90 in Theodore, Alabama. The facility offers Art, English, Math, Psychology and Speech Communication program courses.

Truck Driving Site 
The Truck Driving Site is located at 4551 Halls Mill Road in Mobile. It houses BSCC's commercial driver's license training program.

Administration and organization
BSCC operates under five divisions: Academic Transfer (general education), Health Science Professions, Career Technical Education, Adult Education/GED and Workforce Development.

A typical academic year contains two 15-week terms during the fall (August–December) and spring (January–May). Within the terms are two four-week accelerated sessions or mini terms. The full summer term is ten weeks long (May-August). An academic year begins on the first day of the fall term and ends on the last day of the summer term.

BSCC's endowment had a market value of approximately $152,000 in the fiscal year that ended in 2019.

Academics and programs
BSCC has an open admissions policy. The college offers dual enrollment programs to local high school students. In addition to its associate and certificate degree programs, BSCC offers personal enrichment, professional enhancement and career training courses.

BSCC has transfer agreements with every public four-year institution in Alabama. The agreements allow students to automatically transfer after completing an associate degree at BSCC.

BSCC is a Student Support Services TRIO program participant. The government-funded program helps educationally disadvantaged and disabled students graduate from college and supports low-income and first-generation college students in achieving their career and economic goals.

Student Life

Student Body
As of fall 2020, BSCC's student body consists of 2,176 students. There are 35 percent full time and 65 percent part time students.

Organizations
Several student clubs and organizations operate at BSCC, including honors societies and student government, special interest and service organizations. Campus groups include: Barbering and Hair Styling Association, College Choir, International Student Organization, Pep Squad and STEM Club.

Athletics
The BSCC athletic association chairs six varsity athletic programs. The teams are collectively known as the Wildcats, and belong to the Alabama Community College Conference (ACCC) and Region 22 of the National Junior College Athletic Association (NJCAA). Men's sports include: basketball, baseball and golf. Women's sports include: basketball, fast-pitch softball and volleyball.

Notable alumni 
 Lawrence L. Battiste, IV, Director of Public Safety for the City of Mobile, former Chief of Mobile Police Department
 Mel Showers, retired WKRG news anchor
 Jessie Tompkins, former nationally-ranked track & field athlete who led lawsuit against Whites-only scholarships at Alabama State University

See also 
List of historically black colleges and universities

Notes

References

Historically black universities and colleges in the United States
Universities and colleges accredited by the Southern Association of Colleges and Schools
Educational institutions established in 1927
Community colleges in Alabama
African-American history in Mobile, Alabama
Universities and colleges in Mobile, Alabama
NJCAA athletics
1927 establishments in Alabama